The 1998 Fresno State Bulldogs softball team represented California State University, Fresno in the 1998 NCAA Division I softball season.  The Bulldogs were coached by Margie Wright, who led her thirteenth season.  The Bulldogs finished with a record of 52–11.  They competed in the Western Athletic Conference, where they finished first with a 28–2 record.

The Bulldogs were invited to the 1998 NCAA Division I softball tournament, where they swept the West Regional and then completed a run through the Women's College World Series to claim their first NCAA Women's College World Series Championship.

Roster

Schedule

References

Fresno State
Fresno State Bulldogs softball seasons
Fresno State Softball
Women's College World Series seasons
NCAA Division I softball tournament seasons
Western Athletic Conference softball champion seasons